CS Dinamo București is a professional women's volleyball club based in Bucharest, Romania.

Honours

National competitions
  Romanian Championship: 21
1957, 1958, 1960, 1961, 1962, 1963, 1966, 1967, 1969, 1975, 1976, 1977, 1978, 1979, 1980, 1981, 1982, 1983, 1984, 1985, 1989

  Romanian Cup: 2
2010, 2012

International competitions
CEV Champions League: 
Semifinalists: 1961, 1962
Quarterfinalists: 1967, 1977, 1979, 1982, 1990
CEV Cup: 
Bronze: 1974
Quarterfinalists: 1975, 1991
Challenge Cup:  
Quarterfinalists: 2007, 2008

Team

Current squad
Squad for the 2020-21 season
  Nneka Onyejekwe
  Roxana Bacșiș
  Sânziana Ioana Motroc
  Ana-Marisa Radu
  Irina Kosinski
  Iulia Bratu 
  Lidia-Paula Partnoi
  Sabina Georgia Hantău
  Tara-Anamaria Cristea
  Milagros Collar
  Mariya Karakasheva
  Kristina Guncheva
  Nasya Dimitrova
  Eli Silvi Uattara
  Tássia Silva

Notable former players

See also
 CS Dinamo București (men's volleyball)
 CS Dinamo București (men's handball)
 Romania women's national volleyball team

External links
Official Website 
Profile on Volei Romania

Romanian volleyball clubs
Sport in Bucharest
Volleyball 
1948 establishments in Romania
Volleyball clubs established in 1948